is a former Japanese football player he is the currently goalkeeper coach J1 League club of Avispa Fukuoka.

Playing career
Tsukamoto was born in Nagasaki Prefecture on August 9, 1973. After graduating from Meiji University, he joined newly was promoted to J1 League club, Avispa Fukuoka in 1996. He battles with Tomoaki Sano for the position and played many matches until 1998. However Avispa gained Nobuyuki Kojima in 1999 and Tsukamoto could hardly play in the match behind Kojima from 1999. In late 2001, he became a regular goalkeeper instead Kojima. However Avispa was relegated to J2 League from 2002. Although Kojima left Avispa end of 2001 season, Avispa gained Tomoaki Ogami in 2002 and Tsukamoto could not play many matches. In 2003, Yuichi Mizutani returned to Avispa. Although Tsukamoto battles with Mizutani for the position and played many matches in 2003, he could hardly play in the match from 2004. He retired end of 2005 season. In October 2006, he came back as player at Regional Leagues club V-Varen Nagasaki. He retired end of 2006 season again.

Club statistics

References

External links

1973 births
Living people
Meiji University alumni
Association football people from Nagasaki Prefecture
Japanese footballers
J1 League players
J2 League players
Avispa Fukuoka players
V-Varen Nagasaki players
Association football goalkeepers